Big, Bigger, Biggest is a British documentary television series which began airing in 2008. A total of 20 episodes have been produced across three series.

Format
Each episode explores the engineering breakthroughs that have made it possible to develop the largest structures of today. Episodes describe the landmark inventions that have enabled the engineers of today to construct the world's biggest structures, including computer generated imagery. The imagery shows the size of the object in meters, the various designs that were considered, and what might have happened if the engineers had made a mistake, complete with animated figures running in panic.

It is also available on DVD:

 Series 1 – 208 minutes - 1 DVD - PAL 16:9 Widescreen
 Series 2 – 520 minutes - 3 DVDs - PAL
 Series 3 – 270 minutes - 2 DVDs - PAL 16:9 Widescreen

Episodes

Series 1 (2008)

Series 2 (2009)

Series 3 (2011)

References

National Geographic (American TV channel) original programming
Documentary television series about technology
2000s British documentary television series
2010s British documentary television series
2008 British television series debuts
2011 British television series endings